The Conservative Party of Ontario held its first ever leadership election on December 2, 1920. The event was held to select a replacement for outgoing leader and former Premier of Ontario Sir William Hearst. The party selected George Howard Ferguson, who would become premier after the Ontario general election of 1923.

FERGUSON, George won on first ballot
LAWSON, Earl
HENRY, George

Note:  The vote totals were not announced.

See also
 Progressive Conservative Party of Ontario leadership conventions

References

1920
1920 elections in Canada
Conservative Party of Ontario leadership election